Masjid Al-Taneem is a mosque in the area of Al-Hil, about  away from the Kaaba, in the neighbourhood of At-Tan'im in Makkah, western Saudi Arabia. It is a boundary of the Ḥaram, therefore pilgrims of Ḥajj and ʿUmrah can put on Iḥram. This mosque is also known as Masjid ʿĀʾishah, since Aisha bint Abu Bakr, wife of the Islamic prophet Muhammad, had put on her Ihram from this place once.

This was allowed by the prophet as a special case when Aisha could not complete her umra on account of being in an impure state due to menstrual period. Aisha's brother who accompanied her to Taneem and back did not perform another umra along with his sister, understanding that it was a special allowance made for Aisha or any woman who happens to become impure, due to her menstrual period. Nowadays It is the nearest and most convenient location to enter into Ihram for those residing within the boundaries of the Haram. This is quite a big mosque with facilities for baths, ablution and changing, available for pilgrims and those who come to offer regular prayers.

See also
 Islam in Saudi Arabia
 List of mosques in Saudi Arabia

References

External links

Mosques in Mecca